Yoncalla is a city in Douglas County, Oregon, United States. The population was 1,047 at the 2010 census.

Geography

History 

Settlers first came to the area that would become Yoncalla in a covered wagon in the fall of 1848. Jesse Applegate arrived in 1849, and named the area after the Yoncalla-speaking Native Americans of the region.

In 1920 Yoncalla received attention for electing a female mayor and an all-female city council. Nearly a century later, in 2018, it elected 18-year old Ben Simons mayor.

Demographics

2010 census
As of the census of 2010, there were 1,047 people, 441 households, and 292 families living in the city. The racial makeup of the city was 92.3% White, 1.7% Native American, 0.5% Asian, 0.2% Pacific Islander, 1.7% from other races, and 3.6% from two or more races. Hispanic or Latino of any race were 4.6% of the population.

There were 441 households, of which 28.1% had children under the age of 18 living with them, 47.8% were married couples living together, 12.2% had a female householder with no husband present, 6.1% had a male householder with no wife present, and 33.8% were non-families. 27.2% of all households were made up of individuals, and 14.3% had someone living alone who was 65 years of age or older. The average household size was 2.37 and the average family size was 2.82.

The median age in the city was 46.8 years. 21.1% of residents were under the age of 18; 5.9% were between the ages of 18 and 24; 20.8% were from 25 to 44; 32.2% were from 45 to 64; and 20.1% were 65 years of age or older. The gender makeup of the city was 46.7% male and 53.3% female.

2000 census
As of the census of 2000, there were 1,052 people, 409 households, and 287 families living in the city. The population density was 1,728.1 people per square mile (665.9/km). There were 437 housing units at an average density of 717.8 per square mile (276.6/km). The racial makeup of the city was 93.92% White, 0.48% Native American, 0.48% Asian, 0.57% Pacific Islander, 1.33% from other races, and 3.23% from two or more races. Hispanic or Latino of any race were 1.90% of the population.

There were 409 households, out of which 32.5% had children under the age of 18 living with them, 54.5% were married couples living together, 11.7% had a female householder with no husband present, and 29.8% were non-families. 23.5% of all households were made up of individuals, and 11.2% had someone living alone who was 65 years of age or older. The average household size was 2.56 and the average family size was 3.00.

In the city, the population was spread out, with 26.5% under the age of 18, 7.7% from 18 to 24, 26.0% from 25 to 44, 23.6% from 45 to 64, and 16.3% who were 65 years of age or older. The median age was 38 years. For every 100 females, there were 96.3 males. For every 100 females age 18 and over, there were 93.7 males.

The median income for a household in the city was $26,625, and the median income for a family was $31,250. Males had a median income of $26,806 versus $19,412 for females. The per capita income for the city was $13,756. About 13.3% of families and 18.3% of the population were below the poverty line, including 25.4% of those under age 18 and 17.3% of those age 65 or over.

Notable people
 Jesse Applegate, pioneer who died in Yoncalla in 1888
 Rex Applegate, military officer and author
 Rocky Gale, baseball player, catcher for San Diego Padres
 Hal Turpin, baseball player, member of Pacific Coast League Hall of Fame

References

External links

 City of Yoncalla
 Entry for Yoncalla in the Oregon Blue Book

Cities in Oregon
Cities in Douglas County, Oregon
Former county seats in Oregon
1901 establishments in Oregon
Populated places established in 1901
Oregon placenames of Native American origin